Events in the year 2017 in Madagascar

Incumbents 
President: Hery Rajaonarimampianina
Prime Minister: Olivier Mahafaly Solonandrasana

References 

 
2010s in Madagascar
Years of the 21st century in Madagascar
Madagascar
Madagascar